Thomas Óge Martyn, Mayor of Galway, fl. 1533-c. 1577.

Early life

Martyn was a merchant of Galway and a member of the Martyn family, one of the Tribes of Galway. He was the son of former Mayor of Galway, Wylliam Martin.

West Bridge and Mills

In 1558 he obtained a grant from Queen Mary to build a mill on the west side of the Corrib river, on condition that he build a new stone bridge defended with gates and battlements. 

It was completed in 1562 and bore a plaque declaring that Thomas Óge and his wife Evelina Lynch "caused this bridge and mill to be made". The bridge and mills was demolished c. 1800 and rebuilt as the Bridge Mills by the Murphy family. The rebuilt bridge is now called O'Brien's Bridge.

Later life and descendants

Thomas Óge served as bailiff of Galway from September 1533 to September 1534, and served twice as Mayor of Galway for the terms 1549–1550, and 1562–1563. He served as a master of Galway from 1550 to 1577, after which he disappears from the town records.

He was the father of William Óge Martyn and Francis Martin, both of whom were later Mayors of Galway.

Via William Óge, Thomas Óge is believed to be an ancestor of Richard "Humanity Dick" Martin (1754–1834), Harriet Letitia Martin (1801–91) Mary Letitia Martin (1815–50) and D'Arcy Argue Counsell Martin (1899–1992).

Notes

Óge is the Irish term for the younger or junior.  Martyn was so-called to distinguish him from his grandfather, Thomas Martin, murdered sometime before May 1520.

See also

 The Tribes of Galway

References
 History of Galway, James Hardiman, Galway, 1820.
 Old Galway, Maureen Donovan O'Sullivan, 1942.
 Henry, William (2002). Role of Honour: The Mayors of Galway City 1485-2001. Galway: Galway City Council.  
 Martyn, Adrian (2016). The Tribes of Galway: 1124-1642

External links
 http://www.ucc.ie/celt/published/T100005F/

Year of birth missing
1577 deaths
16th-century Irish businesspeople
People of Elizabethan Ireland
Mayors of Galway
Politicians from County Galway